The Peugeot Kisbee is a scooter model produced by Peugeot Motocycles. Alternatively, it is available as an RS model, which is technically the same, only optically upgraded and painted in different colors. The sporty version is painted in two colors but also contains the same technology.

References

Kisbee
Motor scooters
Motorcycles introduced in 2013